Peroniceras is an ammonite (an extinct group of marine mollusc) belonging to the Ammonitida family Collignoniceratidae.

Species of this genus were widespread throughout the world. They were fast-moving nektonic carnivore shelled ammonoids.

Distribution 
Cretaceous of Antarctica, Cameroon, Canada (British Columbia), Denmark, France, India, Mexico, Nigeria, South Africa, United States (California), Venezuela ; Jurassic of Japan

References

Further reading 
 John Bernard Reeside The cephalopods of the Eagle sandstone and related formations

Ammonitida genera
Collignoniceratidae
Cretaceous ammonites
Ammonites of Africa
Cretaceous Africa
Ammonites of Asia
Jurassic Asia
Ammonites of Europe
Cretaceous Europe
Ammonites of North America
Cretaceous Canada
Cretaceous Mexico
Cretaceous United States
Ammonites of South America
Cretaceous Venezuela
Coniacian genus first appearances
Santonian genus extinctions